The 2020 IFA Shield is the 123rd edition of the IFA Shield. It will have four I-League teams and eight Calcutta Premier Division teams. No overseas teams were invited due to the ongoing COVID-19 pandemic. Real Kashmir beat George Telegraph in the final to win their first IFA Shield title.

Teams

Venue
All the matches were held at Salt Lake Stadium, East Bengal Ground, Mohun Bagan Ground, Sailen Manna Stadium, Rabindra Sarobar Stadium and Kalyani Stadium.

Group stage

Group A

Group B

Group C

Group D

Knockout stage

Bracket

Quarter-finals

Semi-finals

Final

Statistics

Top goal scorers

References

External links 
 IFA Shield 2019-20

IFA Shield seasons
2020 domestic association football cups